2016–17 Premier League may refer to a number of professional sports league seasons:

 Basketball

 2016–17 Icelandic Premier League
 2016–17 Irish Premier League season

 Association football

 2016–17 Armenian Premier League
 2016–17 Azerbaijan Premier League
 2016–17 Premier League of Belize
 2016–17 Premier League of Bosnia and Herzegovina
 2016–17 Egyptian Premier League
 2016–17 Premier League (England)
 2016–17 Premier League International Cup
 2016–17 Hong Kong Premier League
 2016–17 Iraqi Premier League
 2016–17 Israeli Premier League
 2016–17 Kuwaiti Premier League
 2016–17 Lebanese Premier League
 2016–17 Maltese Premier League
 2016–17 National Premier League (Jamaica)
 2016–17 Premier Soccer League (South Africa)
 2016–17 Russian Premier League
 2016–17 Syrian Premier League
 2016–17 Tanzanian Premier League
 2016–17 Ukrainian Premier League
 2016–17 Welsh Premier League

 Cricket

2016–17 Bangladesh Premier League
2016–17 Premier League Tournament (Sri Lanka)